Leopold Moczygemba, OFM Conv (October 18, 1824 – February 23, 1891) was the founder of the first Polish-American parish in Panna Maria and Bandera, Texas.

He was born October 18, 1824, in Groß Pluschnitz, Upper Silesia, Prussia (now Płużnica Wielka, Poland). During his career, he was papal envoy to the United States and founder of the Polish SS. Cyril and Methodius Seminary in Detroit. He also ministered to the ethnic Polish populations of the north-central United States.

Moczygemba was one of the founding members of the Polish-American Association

References

Bibliography 
 
 
 
 
Leopold Moczygemba at the Handbook of Texas Online. Retrieved on March 30, 2007.

1824 births
1891 deaths
19th-century Polish Roman Catholic priests
Conventual Friars Minor
Silesian emigrants to the United States
People from Strzelce County
People from Karnes County, Texas
People from Bandera, Texas
19th-century American Roman Catholic priests